Rune Ulsing (born 7 June 1984) is a Danish male badminton player.

Achievements

European Junior Championships
Boys' Singles

Boys' Doubles

BWF International Challenge/Series
Men's Singles

 BWF International Challenge tournament
 BWF International Series tournament
 BWF Future Series tournament

References

External links
 

1984 births
Living people
Danish male badminton players